Nina Kellgren  (born 26 August 1948) is a British cinematographer. Her work on Solomon & Gaenor (1999) made her the first British woman cinematographer to shoot an Academy Award-nominated film and the second woman in the International Feature Film category. The second woman to join the British Society of Cinematographers, Kellgren was honoured with the John Alcott Memorial Award at the 2021 BSC Awards.

Early life
Kellgren was born in Manchester to Jonas Kellgren, a British physician of Swedish and Russian descent, and Thelma Reynolds, an American nurse of English descent from Amesbury, Massachusetts. She has three sisters as well as a half-sister from her father's previous marriage. Kellgren holds a Bachelor and a Master of Fine Arts from University College London's Slade School of Fine Art, having completed her studies in 1972. She got her first job as a camera assistant to Diane Tammes.

Filmography

Awards and nominations

References

External links

Living people
1948 births
Alumni of the Slade School of Fine Art
English people of Russian descent
English people of Swedish descent
English women cinematographers
Nina